Novgorod Province may refer to:
Novgorod Oblast, a federal subject of Russia
Novgorod Governorate, an administrative division of the Russian Empire
Novgorod Province, Novgorod Governorate, a subdivision of Saint Petersburg Governorate and, after 1727, of Novgorod Governorate